Idiothamnus is a genus of South American flowering plants in the family Asteraceae.

 Species
 Idiothamnus clavisetus (V.M.Badillo) R.M.King & H.Rob. - Venezuela
 Idiothamnus lilloi (B.L.Rob.) R.M.King & H.Rob. - Argentina (Salta + Tucumán)
 Idiothamnus orgyaloides (B.L.Rob.) R.M.King & H.Rob. - Peru
 Idiothamnus pseudorgyalis R.M.King & H.Rob. - Distrito Federal do Brasil, Rio de Janeiro

References

Flora of South America
Eupatorieae
Asteraceae genera